Thomas Robert Stevens (1956 – October 23, 2019) was an American lawyer, politician, and blogger. He founded the Objectivist Party and served as its chair. Stevens was that party's nominee for president in the 2008 and 2012 United States presidential elections. He was the founder of the Personal Freedom Party of New York. Additionally he was the president of the Beaux Arts Society, a position he cherished.  With an interest in the arts, Dr. Stevens also was a play reviewer for Applause! Applause!.

Stevens founded the Objectivist Party on February 2, 2008, the anniversary of the birth of Objectivist philosopher Ayn Rand.

Previously, he had served as president of The New York Young Republican Club during which time the club engaged in an internal feud. He was indicted for attempting to hire a hit man, but he was set up by political enemies, and the charges were dropped.

He previously served as state chairman of the Libertarian Party of Pennsylvania and as an interim vice chairman of the political party Boston Tea Party. In 2010, he announced the formation of the Personal Freedom Party of New York. He was a presidential candidate as well.

He ran the blog site Rising Action, formerly known as Liberty Lion.

Stevens was a graduate of New York University and Maurice A. Deane School of Law at Hofstra University.

Stevens died on October 24, 2019.

References

External links 
 Rising Action, Stevens' blog

1956 births
Date of birth missing
2019 deaths
American bloggers
Maurice A. Deane School of Law alumni
Lawyers from New York City
New York (state) Libertarians
Politicians from New York City
New York University alumni
Objectivists
Candidates in the 2008 United States presidential election
Candidates in the 2012 United States presidential election
21st-century American politicians
Pennsylvania Libertarians
American political party founders